Rose Rayhaan by Rotana, also known as the Rose Tower, is a 72-storey,  hotel on Sheikh Zayed Road in Dubai, United Arab Emirates. It is the fifth world's tallest hotel. The tower was originally to be , but design modification reduced it to 333m or 1093ft.

Construction on the tower began in 2004 and was completed in 2007. The design and build contractor was the Arabian Construction Co. On 24 October 2006, the building reached its full height with the addition of the spire. By total height with spire, the hotel surpassed the nearby  Burj Al Arab. Although the building and its inner furnishings were in place in 2007, it did not open until 23 December 2009.

The hotel’s form is stylistically varied. The highly embellished façade is composed of two tones of blue and silver mirrored glass with gold ornamentation. A narrow panel of oculiform gold rings stretches up the center of each elevation. Each side of the tower incorporates two convex cylindrical forms that fold into one another. Façade sections flatten towards the top and reach up into an elaborate sculptural peak of intersecting petals, a visual reference to the building’s informal name, “The Rose.” This floral element crowning the tower is topped by a sphere. A spire extending up from the roof is the ultimate pinnacle of the tower making its height extend to 333m high. 

Rose Rayhaan by Rotana is one of the first major hotel brands to open in Dubai as alcohol-free. The hotel has two restaurants and a 24-hour coffee shop. Bonyan International Investment Group is the developer and invested $180 million. The building was officially completed with 462 rooms, suites and penthouses. It officially opened on 23 December 2009.

Gallery

See also
 List of tallest hotels in the world
 List of tallest buildings in Dubai
 List of tallest buildings and structures in the world
 List of tallest buildings in the United Arab Emirates

References

External links

 Rose Rayhaan by Rotana – Dubai official website

Rotana Hotel Management Corporation PJSC
Hotel buildings completed in 2007
Hotels established in 2009
Skyscraper hotels in Dubai